Golac is a village in the Municipality of Hrpelje-Kozina in the Littoral region of Slovenia on the border with Croatia.

The parish church in the settlement is dedicated to Saint Nicholas and belongs to the Koper Diocese.

References

External links
Golac on Geopedia

Populated places in the Municipality of Hrpelje-Kozina